"Lords of Summer" is a song by American heavy metal band Metallica. It was first released as a digital single in its demo form on March 19, 2014, with a 12-inch single for it being released as part of Record Store Day Black Friday later that year. In 2016, a re-recorded version was included on the deluxe edition of the band's tenth studio album, Hardwired... to Self-Destruct.

Recording
In February 2014, Metallica began recording a new song at their HQ studio in San Rafael, California, with the working title "X-Dust", planning to premiere it at a March 16, 2014, show in Bogotá, Colombia. They finished it in March and premiered it at the show with the official song title "Lords of Summer". The band re-recorded the song in May and June 2015 for their tenth studio album, Hardwired... to Self-Destruct (2016), including it with the deluxe edition of the album. It is over a minute shorter in length than the demo and first pass versions.

Content and style
According to drummer Lars Ulrich, the song was inspired by the band's then upcoming 2014 tour, as he explained in an interview given to Metal Hammer magazine: "It's about being outdoors and festivals and here we are again." Being an uptempo thrash metal song much in the vein of Metallica's earlier works from the 1980s and being self-referential in nature in terms of its lyrical content, the song alludes to a number of now 'classic' tracks from that particular period, most notably "The Four Horsemen" and "No Remorse" (both from 'Kill 'em All', 1983): "Pounding, pounding, no remorse / Lords of summer set on course / Pushing, pushing horsemen ride / Lords of summer undenied".

Release
The band released the song digitally through the iTunes Store on March 19, 2014, in its demo form. They eventually released the song in a more refined state, dubbed the "First Pass Version", digitally in June. Later that year, they gave the song a physical release for Record Store Day Black Friday as a 12-inch single, with a live version of the song recorded in Rome being used as the B-side. The single was limited to 4,000 copies. A remix of the song by The Glitch Mob was released on May 13, 2015, through YouTube.

Track listing

Personnel
James Hetfield – vocals, rhythm guitar
Kirk Hammett – lead guitar
Robert Trujillo – bass guitar
Lars Ulrich – drums

References

2014 songs
Metallica songs
2014 singles